Nathalie Picqué is a French physicist working at the Max Planck Institute of Quantum Optics
  in the field Frequency Combs, where she studies ultra-high resolution spectroscopy using ultrashort pulses of light combined with Fourier-transform spectroscopy to reveal the fine chemistry of samples, in particular in the mid-infrared, demonstrating resolving power in excess of 1,000,000,000,000.

Education and career 
Nathalie Picqué received a master's degree in laser physics from Paris-Sorbonne University (formerly known as Pierre and Marie Curie University) and Ecole Polytechnique, in Paris, France and completed a doctoral  degree  in  physics from Paris-Saclay University (formerly known as Université Paris-Sud), in Orsay, France in 1998. In 2000 she was awarded the Marie Curie postdoctoral fellowship to work at the European Laboratory for Non-Linear Spectroscopy in Florence, Italy. In 2001, she became a staff scientist at the French National Centre for Scientific Research in Orsay, France.

She joined Max Planck Institute of Quantum Optics in 2008 as a part-time visiting scientist, before relocating her laboratory in Garching while becoming the leader of the research group. She is now a scientist in the Emeritus Group Laser Spectroscopy at the Max Planck Institute of Quantum Optics in, Germany, where she works together with Nobel prize laureate Theodor W. Hänsch on dual-combs spectroscopy.

Awards and honors 
 1999 Marie-Curie postdoctoral fellowship
 2007 Bronze Medal of the CNRS 
 2008 Jean-Jerphagnon Prize (French Physical Society, French Optical Society, French Academy of Technologies) 
 2010 Beller Lectureship Award 
 2013 Coblentz Award 
 2019 Fellow of the Optical Society of America
 2021 Gentner-Kastler Prize (German Physical Society, French Physical Society)
 2021 Advanced Grant (European Research Council) 
 2022 Helmholtz Prize (PTB) 
 2022 Falling Walls Science Breakthrough in Physical Sciences

References

External links

Living people
French women physicists
Pierre and Marie Curie University alumni
Paris-Saclay University alumni
French National Centre for Scientific Research scientists
Fellows of Optica (society)
1973 births
Paris-Sorbonne University alumni
Women in optics
Optical physicists
20th-century French physicists
20th-century French women scientists
21st-century French physicists
21st-century French women scientists